Edaiyiruppu is a village in the Papanasam taluk of Thanjavur district, Tamil Nadu, India.

Demographics 

As per the 2001 census, Edaiyiruppu had a total population of 1297 with 676 males and 621 females. The sex ratio was 919. The literacy rate was 58.53.

References 

 

Villages in Thanjavur district